Julia Sebastián (born 23 November 1993) is an Argentine breaststroke swimmer. She represented Argentina at the 2020 Summer Olympics in the women's 100 metre breaststroke event and the women's 200 metre breaststroke event.

Career 
She won a gold and a silver medal at the 2014 South American Games. As of 2014 she holds national records in all 50–200 m events. She competed at the 2019 Maria Lenk Trophy in Brazil, setting a  South American record, in 200-meter breaststroke .

References

External links

1993 births
Living people
Argentine female swimmers
Argentine female breaststroke swimmers
Swimmers at the 2011 Pan American Games
Swimmers at the 2015 Pan American Games
Swimmers at the 2019 Pan American Games
Swimmers at the 2016 Summer Olympics
Olympic swimmers of Argentina
South American Games gold medalists for Argentina
South American Games silver medalists for Argentina
South American Games medalists in swimming
Competitors at the 2014 South American Games
Pan American Games medalists in swimming
Pan American Games silver medalists for Argentina
Pan American Games bronze medalists for Argentina
Medalists at the 2019 Pan American Games
Swimmers at the 2020 Summer Olympics
Sportspeople from Santa Fe, Argentina
21st-century Argentine women